The Tamá small-eared shrew (Cryptotis tamensis) is a species of mammal in the family Soricidae. Its range includes Venezuela's El Tamá National Park. The closest relatives of the species are C. meridensis and C. thomasi.

References

Cryptotis
Mammals of the Andes
Mammals of Colombia
Mammals of Venezuela
Mammals described in 2002